Daniel G. Riemer (born December 10, 1986) is an American lawyer and Democratic politician.  He is a member of the Wisconsin State Assembly, representing central Milwaukee County since 2013.

Early life and education
Daniel Riemer was born in Milwaukee, Wisconsin, on December 10, 1986.  His father, David Riemer, had been a policy advisor and budget director for former Wisconsin governor Jim Doyle.  Daniel Riemer attended Milwaukee Public Schools and graduated from Milwaukee's Rufus King High School in 2005. He went on to earn his bachelor's degree from the University of Chicago in 2009 and subsequently attended the University of Wisconsin Law School, but his education was interrupted by his entrance into politics.

Political career
In 2011, Wisconsin Republicans held complete control of state government and passed a partisan redistricting plan that drastically redrew the State Assembly map.  The 7th Assembly district, previously dominated by the Milwaukee suburb Greenfield, was redrawn to stretch from West Allis and West Milwaukee, across part of Greenfield, containing neighborhoods of the city of Milwaukee's south side.  The new district contained just 1/3 of the previous constituents.  Riemer launched a primary challenge against Democrat Peggy Krusick in 2012.  At the time, Krusick had been in the Assembly for nearly 30 years—longer than Riemer had been alive.

Riemer prevailed in the primary with 67% of the vote and there were no other major party candidates appearing on the general election ballot.  Krusick decided to run a write-in campaign for the general election, touting her moderate record, but Riemer won a large majority in the new district.

Riemer returned to law school on a part-time basis during the Fall of 2012; he ultimately graduated with his J.D. in December 2013 and was admitted to the State Bar of Wisconsin in April 2014.

Riemer has been reelected four times.  In the 2021–2022 session of the Wisconsin Legislature, he serves on the committees on Health; Insurance; Veterans and Military Affairs; Ways and Means; and Law Revision.

Riemer made a brief run for Mayor of Milwaukee in 2021, following the resignation of Mayor Tom Barrett, but withdrew from the race before the filing deadline.

Personal life 
Riemer married to Paula Phillips on July 30, 2017.  His wife was elected to the Milwaukee Board of School Directors while she and Riemer were engaged, in April 2017, but she did not run for re-election in 2021.  Riemer and his family live on Milwaukee's south side.

Electoral history

References

External links 
 
 
  Representative Daniel Riemer at Wisconsin Legislature
 Official website
 Campaign website (Archived June 14, 2013)
 7th Assembly District map (2011–2021) at Wisconsin Legislature

1986 births
Living people
Politicians from Milwaukee
Democratic Party members of the Wisconsin State Assembly
University of Chicago alumni
University of Wisconsin Law School alumni
21st-century American politicians
Lawyers from Milwaukee